Hard Reyne is the second solo album by Australian singer/songwriter James Reyne. It was released in May 1989 and peaked at number 7 on the ARIA Charts. The album produced four singles, "House of Cards", "One More River", "Trouble in Paradise" and "Harvest Moon".

Review
Tomas Mureika of AllMusic said; "Further collaboration with Simon Hussey finds Reyne treading water to some degree, trying to replicate the success of his debut, while lacking the fury and energy that made that album so utterly compelling. "One More River" and "Wake Up Deadman" share a more traditionally bluesy feel, while "House Of Cards" tries to echo the intensity of earlier classics. A mellower, less surprising effort. Hard Reyne is not a bad album by any means, there is just nothing here to render it great."

Track listing
"House of Cards" (James Reyne, Simon Hussey) – 4:26
"Rumour" (Reyne, Hussey) – 3:32
"No Such Thing as Love" (Reyne, Hussey) – 4:32
"One More River" (Reyne) – 4:01
"Shine On" (Reyne, Hussey) – 5:39
"Harvest Moon" (Reyne, Hussey) – 4:14
"Lamp of Heaven" (Reyne, Hussey) – 3:19
"Drifting Away (Confusion of Slow Novas)" (Reyne, Hussey) – 3:37
"Trouble in Paradise" (Reyne, Mark Grieg) – 4:08
"Five Miles Closer to the Sun" (Reyne, Hussey) – 4:37
"Wake Up Dead Man" (Reyne, Hussey) – 3:43

Personnel
 Judy Cheeks – backing vocals (track 4)
 Sony Southon – backing vocals (tracks 5, 7 and 9)
 Andy Cichon – bass
 John Watson – drums
 James Ralston – guitar (tracks: 1 to 5, 9)
 Simon Hussey – keyboards, sequencer programming, congas
 Ollie Marland – piano (track 6)
 Gary Barnacle – saxophone (tracks 1 and 4)
 John Thirkell – trumpet (track 1)

Charts

Weekly charts

Year-end charts

References

1989 albums
James Reyne albums
Capitol Records albums